Kyle Evans (born 11 September 1990) is a Welsh professional rugby league footballer who last played as a er for Featherstone Rovers in the Betfred Championship and  at international level.

Evans previously played professional rugby union for Llanelli, Moseley, Merthyr and the Doncaster Knights.

Playing career

Rugby union
Evans started his career with rugby union side Llanelli. He spent three seasons with the club in the Welsh Premiership, scoring 27 tries in 57 appearances, and was called up by Scarlets to play in the Anglo-Welsh Cup.

After one season in the English Championship with Moseley, he returned to Wales in 2016, joining Merthyr. In 2018, he won the Welsh Premiership Player of the Year award.

In May 2019, Evans returned to the English Championship, signing a two-year contract with Doncaster Knights.

Rugby league
Evans spent time training with rugby league side Leeds Rhinos after being recommended to the club by Doncaster coach Francis Cummins, who had previously played for Leeds, but his spell at the club was cut short due to lockdowns during the COVID-19 pandemic.

In June 2022, Evans signed a contract with Wakefield Trinity after a successful trial. He made his début in the Super League against the Wigan Warriors.

Evans was named in the Wales squad for the 2021 Rugby League World Cup. He made his debut against Tonga, scoring Wales' only try in a 6–32 defeat.

References

External links
Wales profile
Welsh profile

1990 births
Living people
Doncaster Knights players
Featherstone Rovers players
Llanelli RFC players
Moseley Rugby Football Club players
Merthyr RFC players
Rugby league players from Port Talbot
Rugby league wingers
Rugby union players from Port Talbot
Rugby union wings
Wakefield Trinity players
Wales national rugby league team players
Welsh rugby league players
Welsh rugby union players